In mathematics, the fractional Laplacian is an operator, which generalizes the notion of spatial derivatives to fractional powers.

Definition

For , the fractional Laplacian of order s  can be defined on functions  as a Fourier multiplier given by the formula

where the Fourier transform  of a function  is given by

More concretely, the fractional Laplacian can be written as a singular integral operator defined by

where . These two definitions, along with several other definitions, are equivalent.

See also
Fractional calculus
Nonlocal operator
Riemann-Liouville integral

References

External links
 "Fractional Laplacian". Nonlocal Equations Wiki, Department of Mathematics, The University of Texas at Austin.

Fractional calculus